Dennis C. H. Yip (born 28 Jul 1967) rode a total of 59 winners when he was a jockey between 1984 and 1993. In 2002-03, he became a licensed trainer. Yip trained over 30 winners in every year of his nine-year training career, landing 41 winners in 2010/11 for an overall total of 368.

Performance

References
Official Hong Kong Jockey Club site
The Hong Kong Jockey Club – Trainer Information
The Hong Kong Jockey Club

Hong Kong horse trainers
Living people
1967 births